Back Roads is a 2018 American drama film directed by Alex Pettyfer in his directorial debut. The screenplay by Tawni O'Dell and Adrian Lyne was adapted from O'Dell's bestselling novel of the same name. Starring Alex Pettyfer, Jennifer Morrison, Nicola Peltz, Robert Patrick and Juliette Lewis, the film centers on a young man living in the Pennsylvania backwoods who must care for his three younger sisters after his mother is arrested for murdering his father.  

Back Roads premiered at the 2018 Tribeca Film Festival and was acquired by Samuel Goldwyn Films. It received a limited release in the United States on December 7, 2018, and was later released on video on demand and digital.

Plot
After his mother is imprisoned for killing his abusive father, Harley Altmyer is left to care for his three younger sisters in rural Pennsylvania. Harley forgoes his college education, working dead-end jobs to pay the bills and raise his siblings, which include the rebellious and promiscuous Amber, the withdrawn Misty, and youngest daughter Jody. 

Scarred by his past, Harley becomes infatuated with Callie Mercer, an older married woman who lives nearby. Things take a dangerous turn when they embark on an affair and family secrets threaten to surface and consume Harley.

Cast

Production

Development 
An adaptation of Tawni O'Dells 1999 novel had been a long-gestating project for Adrian Lyne and was set to be his return to directing after a twenty-year absence. In 2011, Andrew Garfield, Jennifer Garner, and Marcia Gay Harden were reportedly attached to star, with Lyne directing from a script he co-wrote with O'Dell. 

In 2012, Garfield dropped out of the project due to scheduling conflicts with The Amazing Spider-Man. The project was later abandoned after financing fell through. Alex Pettyfer, who originally read for the role of Harley back in 2008, secured the rights to the novel with his production company Upturn Productions. Pettyfer initially had plans of only producing and acting in the film, but after two unnamed directors passed on the film due to scheduling conflicts, Pettyfer stepped in to direct himself. Lyne remained as an executive producer. 

When he was still attached as director, Lyne had envisioned the film as a big-budgeted studio effort that leaned more into the eroticized elements the director is known for. Pettyfer left out the more sexual elements in Lyne’s original script and went in a darker direction that focused more on the "exploration of family drama" and trauma.

Filming 
Filming took place in the town of St. Francisville in the Baton Rouge area of Louisiana, beginning on March 2017 and taking 19 days.

Pettyfer chose to set the film in the 1990s, saying, "There’s only a pay phone, and you begin feeling more and more closed in. In the beginning, there are opening shots of landscape, but then it becomes darker and more confined."

Release 
The film premiered at the Tribeca Festival on April 20, 2018. On August 16, 2018, Samuel Goldwyn Films acquired North American distribution rights to the film. Back Roads was released on December 7, 2018, in select theaters and video on demand in the United States. A DVD release was issued on March 5, 2019. In the UK, the film was released to digital platforms on July 6, 2020.

Critical reception 
The website's critics consensus reads: "Uneven yet ultimately intriguing, Back Roads serves as a memorable calling card for star and debuting director Alex Pettyfer's talent behind the camera."

Monica Castillo of RogerEbert.com said, "While the dark family dynamics may bring to mind Winter’s Bone or this summer’s much-discussed miniseries, Sharp Objects," the characters and affair subplot are underdeveloped. Owen Gleiberman of Variety wrote Pettyfer "does a skillful job of establishing an atmosphere of small-town service-economy desolation" and Lewis is "superb", but concluded that the film "is more audacious than it is convincing". Leslie Felperin of The Guardian opined, "The performances are sturdy, even so, and the whole has a sombre determination that makes it likable and rather camp."  

Dan Callahan of TheWrap was more positive, praising Pettyfer's direction as "an accomplished debut". Callahan added the film "shows how interested he seems to be in the scarier byways of life, which seemed clear in his performance last year in The Strange Ones, a very disturbing and neglected movie about child abuse that seems now like a companion piece to Back Roads, a film that stares unflinchingly at some of the rougher human experiences."

Accolades 
At the Rhode Island International Film Festival, Back Roads won the First Prize award for Best Feature.

References

External links 

 
 
 

2018 films
2018 drama films
2018 crime drama films
2018 thriller drama films
2018 independent films
American crime drama films
American drama films
American thriller drama films
Films based on American novels
Films about dysfunctional families
Adultery in films
Films about child sexual abuse
Films about poverty in the United States
Incest in film
Films set in the 1990s
Films set in Pennsylvania
Films shot in Louisiana
2018 directorial debut films
2010s English-language films
2010s American films